Dominique Farran (18 April 1947 – 5 November 2019) was a French radio host and journalist.

Biography
Farran worked for Paris Match as a journalist and for RTL as a music columnist, where he covered rock concerts for 20 years.

Significant events covered by Farran include Ike and Tina Turner, Pink Floyd, Paul McCartney, The Rolling Stones, and Michel Polnareff.

He was also host of "Live", which was renamed to "WRTL Live" in 1980. The show was broadcast on Saturday nights.

References

French radio presenters
French columnists
French music journalists
French journalists
Paris Match writers
2019 deaths
1947 births